Annual records of the Syracuse Orange football team.

Yearly records

References

Syracuse
Syracuse Orange football seasons